The Taça Brasil was the Brazilian national football championship contested from 1959 to 1968.

Bahia, Cruzeiro and Botafogo were the only champions to have played all phases of the tournament, because until the 1968 edition teams from Rio de Janeiro and São Paulo were already qualified to the semi-finals. Both Cruzeiro and Bahia, the only champions not from Rio or São Paulo, beat the Santos Futebol Clube whose players included Pelé, Coutinho and Pepe.

In 1989 the Copa do Brasil was created, in the same cup-style and also qualifying to the Copa Libertadores.

Relationship with the Copa Libertadores
The Taça Brasil was founded to enable Brazil to provide contenders for the newly created Copa Libertadores de América.

From 1959 to 1964 the winner of Taça Brasil was selected to be the sole Brazilian competitor in the next year's Copa Libertadores. In 1965 and 1966, the two finalists of the Taça Brasil were both chosen to represent Brazil in the next year's Copa Libertadores, which was expanded in 1966. In 1967 and 1968, the winner of the Taça Brasil qualified for the next year's Copa Libertadores, along with the winner of the Torneio Roberto Gomes Pedrosa (also known as the "Taça de Prata"). 1968 was the last year the Taça Brasil was contested; in 1969 and 1970 the top two teams in the Torneio Roberto Gomes Pedrosa became the two Brazilian entrants in the following year's Copa Libertadores, before the formation of the Campeonato Brasileiro, a Brazilian national league championship, in 1971.

Champions

Titles by team
5 titles
Santos
2 titles
Palmeiras
1 title
Bahia
Botafogo
Cruzeiro

Top goal scorers

 1959 - 8 goals - Léo (Bahia)
 1960 - 7 goals - Bececê (Fortaleza)
 1961 - 7 goals - Pelé (Santos)
 1962 - 7 goals - Coutinho (Santos)
 1963 - 8 goals - Pelé (Santos) and Ruitter (Confiança)
 1964 - 7 goals - Pelé (Santos)
 1965 - 9 goals - Bitá (Náutico)
 1966 - 10 goals - Bitá (Náutico) and Toninho Guerreiro (Santos)
 1967 - 6 goals - Chiclete (Treze)
 1968 - 7 goals - Ferreti (Botafogo)

External links
 CBF Confederação Brasileira de Futebol - Brazilian Football Confederation
 Taça Brasil at RSSSF Brasil
 Eternal matches: Cruzeiro 6x2 Santos

 
Defunct football cup competitions in Brazil